Yahşihan railway station is a railway station in Yahşihan, Turkey, just west of Kırıkkale. The station was built in 1924 and opened on 20 November 1925 by the Anatolian—Baghdad Railways and was one of the first railway stations built by the newly formed Republic of Turkey.

TCDD Taşımacılık operates three daily intercity trains from Ankara to Kars, Kurtalan, and Tatvan, Regional train service between Ankara and Kırıkkale was suspended in 2016, due to the construction of the Başkentray commuter rail project. When completed in mid-April 2018, regional rail service is expected to return.

References

External links
Kırıkkale station timetable
Kırıkkale station timetable

Railway stations in Kırıkkale Province
Railway stations opened in 1925
1925 establishments in Turkey